Bigfoot Bonkers is an arcade game for two players released by Meadows Games in 1976. It is a clone of Blockade, the first of what would later be called snake games, released the same year.

Gameplay
Players move their blocks across the screen to create walls to try to surround their opponents and force them to crash into the walls or any block or obstacle like a 'foot'.

See also
Barricade
Dominos

References

1976 video games
Arcade video games
Arcade-only video games
Snake video games
Video game clones
Video games developed in the United States